Rolf Hermichen (25 July 1918 – 23 May 2014) was a German Luftwaffe fighter ace and recipient of the Knight's Cross of the Iron Cross with Oak Leaves during World War II. The Knight's Cross of the Iron Cross and its higher grade Oak Leaves was awarded to recognise extreme battlefield bravery or successful military leadership.

Career
He was born in Wernigerode in the district of Harz.

On 15 July 1942, Hermichen was appointed Staffelkapitän (squadron leader) of 3. Staffel of JG 26. He succeeded Oberleutnant Johannes Schmidt who was transferred. On 13 June 1943, the Gruppenkommandeur (group commander) of III. Gruppe, Hauptmann Kurt Ruppert was killed in action. Command of the Gruppe was temporarily given to Hermichen. On 29 June, Geschwaderkommodore Josef Priller appointed Major Klaus Mietusch as the new commander of III. Gruppe. Mietusch assumed command on 5 July and Hermichen returned to 3. Staffel.

On 16 October 1943, Herminchen was appointed Gruppenkommandeur of I. Gruppe of Jagdgeschwader 11 (JG 11—11th Fighter Wing). He succeeded Hauptmann Erich Woitke who temporarily led the Gruppe after Hauptmann Erwin Clausen was killed in action on 4 October. On 2 April 1944, Hermichen was presented the Knight's Cross of the Iron Cross by Generaloberst Hans-Jürgen Stumpff at the airfield in Rotenburg an der Wümme. The Knight's Cross had been awarded on 26 March.

On 12 May, the Eighth Army Air Force targeted the German fuel industry. In total 886 four-engined bombers, escorted by 980 fighter aircraft, headed for the five main synthetic fuel factories in middle Germany in area of Leuna, Merseburg, Böhlen and Zeitz, and the Protectorate of Bohemia and Moravia and Brüx. That day, Hermichen was shot down in aerial combat near Limburg an der Lahn. In consequence, he was transferred to the staff of the 2. Jagd-Division (2nd Fighter Division) based in Stade. Hermichen was replaced by Oberleutnant Hans-Heinrich Koenig as commander of I. Gruppe.

Summary of career

Aerial victory claims
According to Obermaier, Hermichen is credited with 64 aerial victories claimed in 629 combat missions, 11 of them while flying the Messerschmitt Bf 110. He shot down 53 enemy aircraft in Defense of the Reich, including 26 four-engine strategic bombers. Forsyth also lists him with 26 heavy bombers shot down. Mathews and Foreman, authors of Luftwaffe Aces – Biographies and Victory Claims, researched the German Federal Archives and found records for 49 aerial victory claims, plus eight further unconfirmed claims. This figure includes 11 aerial victories on the Eastern Front and 38 over the Western Allies, including 17 four-engine bombers.

Victory claims were logged to a map-reference (PQ = Planquadrat), for example "PQ 35 Ost 28321". These sectors were then subdivided into 36 smaller units to give a location area 3 × 4 km in size.

Awards
 Iron Cross (1939)
 2nd Class (24 April 1940)
 1st Class (7 June 1940)
 Honour Goblet of the Luftwaffe on 5 January 1942 as Oberleutnant and pilot
 German Cross in Gold on 15 October 1942 as Oberleutnant in the 3./Jagdgeschwader 26
 Knight's Cross of the Iron Cross with Oak Leaves
 Knight's Cross on 26 March 1944 as Hauptmann and Gruppenkommandeur  of the I./Jagdgeschwader 11
 748th Oak Leaves on 19 February 1945 as Major and  Gruppenkommandeur  of the I./Jagdgeschwader 11

Notes

References

Citations

Bibliography

 
 
 
 
 
 
 
 
 
 
 
 
 
 
 
 
 

1918 births
2014 deaths
People from Wernigerode
Luftwaffe pilots
German World War II flying aces
Recipients of the Gold German Cross
Recipients of the Knight's Cross of the Iron Cross with Oak Leaves
People from the Province of Saxony
Military personnel from Saxony-Anhalt